The Clach a' Charridh or Shandwick Stone is a Class II Pictish stone located near Shandwick on the Tarbat peninsula in Easter Ross, Scotland. It is a scheduled monument.

Carving
It is a Class II stone, with the cross facing the seaward side, and the secular scene facing inland. The latter contains six panels, the first (from top to bottom) being a standard Pictish double-disc, the second being a Pictish Beast and the third being a possible hunting scene, with warriors depicted alongside an eagle, a boar, and various other creatures. The bottom three panels consist of woven patterns. The stone is now encased in a glass cover room.

History
The Gaelic name (Clach a’ Charaidh) means ‘stone of the grave-plots’. A burial ground here was recorded in 1889 as last used during the cholera epidemic of 1832 and ploughed under about 1885.

References

 Scott, Douglas, The Stones of the Pictish Peninsulas, (Hilton Trust, 2004)

External links
 Am Baile

Pictish stones in Highland (council area)
Pictish stones
Scheduled Ancient Monuments in Highland

fr:Pierres Pictes de Ross